Lineth Enid Fabienne Beerensteyn (born 11 October 1996) is a Dutch professional footballer who plays as a forward for Serie A club Juventus and the Netherlands national team.

Club career 
On 21 June 2022, Beerensteyn joined Juventus from Bayern Munich.

International career
On 4 June 2016, she made her debut for the Dutch national team, in a friendly match against South Africa.

She was part of the Dutch team which won the UEFA Women's Euro 2017.

Career statistics
Scores and results list the Netherlands' goal tally first, score column indicates score after each Beerensteyn goal.

Honours
ADO Den Haag
 KNVB Women's Cup: 2012–13
 BeNe Super Cup runner-up: 2012–13

Bayern Munich
 Frauen-Bundesliga: 2020–21

Netherlands U19
 UEFA Women's Under-19 Championship: 2014

Netherlands
 UEFA European Women's Championship: 2017
 Algarve Cup: 2018

References

External links
 Senior national team profile at Onsoranje.nl 
 Under-19 national team profile at Onsoranje.nl (in Dutch)
 Under-17 national team profile at Onsoranje.nl (in Dutch)
 Under-16 national team profile at Onsoranje.nl (in Dutch)
 Under-15 national team profile at Onsoranje.nl (in Dutch)
 
 

1996 births
Living people
Footballers from The Hague
Women's association football forwards
Dutch women's footballers
Netherlands women's international footballers
Eredivisie (women) players
Frauen-Bundesliga players
Serie A (women's football) players
ADO Den Haag (women) players
FC Twente (women) players
FC Bayern Munich (women) players
Juventus F.C. (women) players
Dutch expatriate women's footballers
Dutch expatriate sportspeople in Germany
Dutch expatriate sportspeople in Italy
Expatriate women's footballers in Germany
Expatriate women's footballers in Italy
UEFA Women's Championship-winning players
Knights of the Order of Orange-Nassau
2019 FIFA Women's World Cup players
Footballers at the 2020 Summer Olympics
Olympic footballers of the Netherlands
UEFA Women's Euro 2022 players
UEFA Women's Euro 2017 players